James W. Sullivan (July 17, 1909 – October 10, 1974) was an American art director. He was nominated for an Academy Award in the category Best Art Direction for the film Around the World in 80 Days.

Selected filmography
 Around the World in 80 Days (1956)

References

External links

1909 births
1974 deaths
American art directors
People from Missouri